Alfonso Gómez Méndez (born 19 August 1949) served as the 9th Minister of Justice and Law of Colombia.

Alfonso was born on 19 August 1949 in Chaparral, Tolima. He attended Universidad Externado de Colombia where he graduated in Law in 1971.

On 9 March 1989, the Senate of Colombia elected Gómez to succeed Horacio Serpa Uribe as Inspector General of Colombia. Gómez, who at the time was serving as Chamber Representative, was nominated by President Virgilio Barco Vargas. On 23 November 1990 Gómez resigned citing political pressure; the Deputy Inspector, the Assistant Inspector, the Secretary General, and 23 Delegate Inspectors, all presented their resignation in solidarity with the Inspector General. The backlash from the Senate and others in military and right-wing political circles against Gómez and his department, stemmed from the ruling of the Office of the Inspector General against Army General Jesús Armando Arias Cabrales and Army Colonel Edilberto Sánchez Rubiano for their role during the 1985 Palace of Justice siege.

In January 1991, following his resignation as Inspector General, President César Gaviria Trujillo appointed Gómez Ambassador of Colombia to Austria. While in Vienna, Gómez also served as Permanent Representative of Colombia to the United Nations Office at Geneva.

In 1996 Gómez was elected to the International Narcotics Control Board for a five-year term. Shortly after, on 29 May 1997 the Supreme Court of Justice of Colombia elected Gómez to serve as the 3rd Attorney General of Colombia to succeed Alfonso Valdivieso Sarmiento. Gómez was elected out of a ternary slate presented by President Ernesto Samper Pizano that also included the names of Saturia Esguerra Portocarrero and Manuel Santiago Urueta Ayola. In 1998, Board President Hamid Ghodse asked Gómez to step down citing concerns of a possible conflict of interest; Gómez refused this request, but ultimately resigned citing his "extremely tight work schedule".

Selected works

References

1949 births
Living people
People from Chaparral, Tolima
Universidad Externado de Colombia alumni
Academic staff of Universidad Externado de Colombia
20th-century Colombian lawyers
Colombian Liberal Party politicians
Members of the Chamber of Representatives of Colombia
Inspectors General of Colombia
Ambassadors of Colombia to Austria
Attorneys General of Colombia
Ministers of Justice and Law of Colombia